The Jesters is an Australian comedy series produced for Movie Extra subscription television channel. The series is a satire about the day-to-day battles of a sketch comedy veteran turned producer.

Cast
 Mick Molloy as Dave Davies
 Emily Taheny as Kat Bailey
 Ben Geurens as Steve Morris
 Christian Barratt-Hill as Michael Stevens
 Andrew Ryan as Zak Green
 Travis Cotton as Tony Coggan
 Susie Porter as Julia Wilson
 Deborah Kennedy as Di Sunnington

Overview
The Jesters is a slick, sick and darkly comic look behind-the-scenes of a TV comedy show that proves the old maxim that nobody likes a smartarse – unless, of course, they are bringing in huge ratings.

From the absurd antics of the TV writers' room to the even more absurd network board meetings, The Jesters reveals the key ingredients of what goes into making the people of Australia laugh: jealousy, pettiness, treachery, extreme stupidity.

Episodes
Season 1

Season 2

See also
 List of Australian television series

References

External links
 The Jesters official website
 

Movie Extra original programming
Australian comedy television series
2009 Australian television series debuts
2010s Australian television series
Australian television sketch shows
Australian satirical television shows